The United States Deep Water Royalty Relief Act (DWRRA) implemented a royalty-relief program that relieves eligible leases from paying royalties on defined amounts of deep-water petroleum production over Federal Outer Continental Shelf lands. After its expiration in 2000, the DWRRA was redefined and extended to promote continued interest in deep water. The Minerals Management Service (MMS) defines a "deep-water" lease as having a minimum water depth of 200 meters (656 ft).

Under the Outer Continental Shelf Lands Act, as amended in 1978, and under the provisions of the DWRRA of 1995, relief from royalty obligations may be granted to increase production or to encourage development on certain producing or non-producing leases. Royalty relief may be applied to either active leases or to newly offered leases directly in their fiscal terms. The primary MMS royalty relief programs include those that were required for Gulf of Mexico deepwater leases (located in water depth greater than 200 meters or 656 feet) issued in 1996-2000 under the DWRRA. After certain sunset provisions in the DWRRA expired in November 2000, the MMS adopted a program that provides lower amounts of royalty relief to each lease. The Federal Government has also offered royalty relief incentives since 2001 for natural gas production from certain deep wells in shallow water (15,000 feet total well depth) for newly issued leases, and commenced a similar program for active shallow water leases where drilling started on or after March 26, 2003.

About 45 percent of the natural gas proved reserves and 79 percent of the crude oil proved reserves in the Federal Gulf of Mexico are in deepwater areas, although not all of this is subject to royalty relief. The following sections highlight provisions in several rules and regulations under which oil and natural gas production volumes may receive royalty relief.

Oil and gas law
United States federal energy legislation